Abraham ben Solomon Treves (Tzarfati) (1470–1552) was a Jewish scholar of the 16th century. He emigrated from Italy to Turkey, where he officiated as rabbi of German and Portuguese congregations in Adrianople and various other cities. He favored the Sephardic ritual, and corresponded with David Cohen and Elijah Mizrahi. From one of his letters to Joseph Caro it appears that he was a physician also. He was the first scholar to quote the Kol Bo, and was the author of Birkat Abraham, a work on the ritual.

References

 Its bibliography:
Marco Mortara, Indice, p. 66;
Zunz, Ritus, p. 32, note b;
Moritz Steinschneider, Cat Bodl. col. 711;
Benjacob, Oẓar ha-Sefarim, p. 87;
Azulai, Shem ha-Gedolim, ii.20;
Brüll's Jahrb. i.109-111.

1470s births
1552 deaths
16th-century rabbis from the Ottoman Empire
Italian emigrants to the Ottoman Empire
16th-century Italian rabbis